The 2009–10 NCAA Division I women's ice hockey season began on October 2, 2009, ending with the 2010 NCAA Division I Women's Ice Hockey Tournament's championship game on March 21, 2010 at Ridder Arena in Minneapolis. It marked the third time that Minneapolis had hosted the Frozen Four. The tournament's opening round was scheduled for Friday, February 26, 2010, followed by the Final Faceoff on Saturday through Sunday, March 6–7, 2010. The quarterfinals were played on Friday through Saturday, March 12–13, 2010, with the Frozen Four played on Friday and Saturday, March 19 and 20, 2010.

Season outlook

Pre-season polls
September 17: The Mercyhurst College women's hockey team has been predicted to finish first in the College Hockey America Preseason Coaches' Poll. The poll was released by CHA league officials. Mercyhurst claimed four of five possible first-place votes and 16 points to earn the top ranking for the eighth-straight season. Robert Morris came in second with 14 points after finishing with a 5-9-2 mark in conference play a season ago. Wayne State was slated third with nine points and Syracuse landed at No. 4 with eight points. Niagara, was ranked No. 5 with five points.
September 22:St. Lawrence has been selected to finish in first place in the ECAC in the preseason poll. The voting was done by the league coaches as part of the pre-season polls and all-league team. The Saints, garnered a total of 107 points, including three of 12 first-place votes. St. Lawrence, boasts returning all-league selection senior defender Britni Smith. Last season, the team finished second in the regular-season standings with a mark of 16-5-1.
 September 24:The Badgers are the preseason pick to win the Western Collegiate Hockey Association women's title, according to a poll of league coaches. Wisconsin went 34-2-5 last season en route to its third NCAA title in four years. The Badgers collected six first-place votes and 48 points in a poll of the eight coaches. Defending WCHA champion Minnesota, placed second with 43 points and two first-place votes. Minnesota Duluth, with 38 points, was selected to finish third. All three of those teams qualified for the NCAA Frozen Four last season.

Exhibition

CIS Exhibition
Throughout the season, various NCAA schools will play Canadian Interuniversity Sport hockey teams in exhibition games.

Canadian semipro exhibition
Throughout the season, various NCAA schools will play semipro Canadian teams in exhibition games.

US Olympic exhibition games
Throughout the season, various NCAA schools will play the United States Olympic Hockey team.

Regular season
November 7: The 10th-ranked Harvard women's ice hockey team had a 3-0 shutout victory over No. 7 St. Lawrence at Bright Hockey Center. The Crimson earned the program's 500th victory.

Standings

Outdoor Games
On Friday, January 8, 2010, Boston's Fenway Park played host to a Hockey East doubleheader.  In the first game, New Hampshire faced off against Northeastern in an outdoor college hockey doubleheader in the first outdoor women’s hockey game in the sport’s history. Northeastern surged to a 2-0 lead, but New Hampshire rallied to win 5-3.  The latter game featured the men's teams from Boston College and Boston University, in which BU won 3-2.
The Wisconsin women's team will host the Camp Randall Hockey Classic on Feb. 6, 2010 at Camp Randall Stadium. The UW women's hockey program will take on the Bemidji State Beavers outdoors at the stadium as part of their weekend series, while the men's program will follow against the Michigan Wolverines in what will serve as the United States Hockey Hall of Fame Game.

Season Tournaments

Easton Holiday Classic

Rankings

October

November

December

January

February

March

2010 Olympics

Active players
The following active NCAA players will represent their respective countries in Ice hockey at the 2010 Winter Olympics.

Former players

Post-season tournaments

NCAA tournament

Regionals

Frozen Four

Stats leaders

Scoring
This is an INCOMPLETE list

Goaltending

Other

Awards and honors

Patty Kazmaier Memorial Award Nominees

Patty Kazmaier Memorial Award Finalists

National and Conference Awards

All-conference honors

CHA

ECAC

HEA

WCHA

All-rookie team

CHA

ECAC

HEA

WCHA

All-America honors

First team

Second team

New England Hockey Writers All-Star Team
Forwards
Kate Buesser - Harvard
Ashley Cottrell - Providence
Jenna Cunningham - Dartmouth
Micaela Long - New Hampshire
Sarah Parsons - Dartmouth
Kelly Paton - New Hampshire
Defense
Cristin Allen - Connecticut
Courtney Birchard - New Hampshire
Amber Yung - Providence
Tara Watchorn - Boston University
Goalies
Florence Schelling - Northeastern
Victoria Vigilanti - Quinnipiac
Coach of the Year: Rick Seeley - Quinnipiac
Player of the Year: Kelly Paton - New Hampshire

All Ivy League honors
First Team All-Ivy
F - Catherine White, Cornell
F - Sarah Parsons, Dartmouth
F - Kate Buesser, Harvard
D - Laura Fortino, Cornell
D - Lauriane Rougeau, Cornell
G - Amanda Mazzotta, Cornell
G - Jacklyn Snikeris, Yale
Second Team All-Ivy
F - Chelsea Karpenko, Cornell
F - Jillian Dempsey, Harvard
F - Bray Ketchum, Yale
D - Leanna Coskren, Harvard
D - Sasha Sherry, Princeton
G - Katie Jamieson, Brown
Honorable Mention
F - Danielle DiCesare, Princeton
F - Paula Romanchuk, Princeton
D - Cori Bassett, Harvard
D - Alyssa Clarke, Yale
G - Christina Kessler, Harvard
Player of the Year, Catherine White, Cornell
Rookie of the Year, Lauriane Rougeau, Cornell

Frozen Four Skills Competition
The Frozen Four skills competition will be held on April 9 at Ford Field in Detroit, Michigan.

Eastern squad
Melissa Anderson, Boston University
Anna McDonald, Harvard
Sarah Parsons, Dartmouth
Kelly Paton, New Hampshire
Britni Smith, St. Lawrence
Allie Thunstrom, Boston College
The two goalies are:
Brittony Chartier, St. Lawrence
Melissa Haber, Boston U.

Western squad
Kelli Blankenship, Minnesota
Rachel Davis, Ohio State
Caitlin Hogan, St. Cloud State
Kyla Sanders, Wisconsin
Chelsea Walkland, Robert Morris
Ashley Young, Minnesota State Mankato .
The two goalies are:
Lauren Bradel, St. Thomas (Minnesota)
Lindsey Park, Wayne State

See also
National Collegiate Women's Ice Hockey Championship
2009–10 College Hockey America women's ice hockey season
2009–10 Eastern College Athletic Conference women's ice hockey season
2009-10 WCHA women's ice hockey season
2009–10 NCAA Division I men's ice hockey season
2009–10 NCAA Division I women's basketball season

References

 
NCAA
NCAA
NCAA
NCAA Division I women's ice hockey seasons